Alice Taylor is a British entrepreneur. She is founder of MakieLab, an "'entertainment playspace for young people' that will invite users to download and print 3D dolls and accessories."

Early life and education
Taylor attended the University of London between 1990 and 1994.

Career 
Taylor is former commissioning editor, Education for the British TV station Channel 4, where she developed a number of informal learning projects involving ARGs, casual gaming and other interactive entertainment formats. Before this, she was the Vice President of Digital Content for BBC Worldwide. In September 2006 she was named one of the Game Industry's 100 Most Influential Women by Next Generation Magazine Online. She founded and edits the blog Wonderland.

In 1997, she was defense on the first UK Quake team, and a member of the UK's Demonic Core clan. In September 2002 she was an exhibit in the Game On exhibition at the Barbican, and featured in the accompanying book, Game On: The History and Culture of Video Games.

In 2017, Disney acquired Makie Labs technology and personnel for an undisclosed figure.

In keeping with the  strategic acquisition, Ms Taylor is now the Director, StudioLab at The Walt Disney Studios. In that role she is responsible for ensuring that Disney continues to invest in the intersection between online tech and content distribution.

Personal life 
In 2008, Taylor's daughter with Cory Doctorow, Poesy Emmeline Fibonacci Nautilus Taylor Doctorow was born. Taylor and Doctorow married in 2008. She moved with her family from London to Los Angeles in the early 2000s.

References

External links

Year of birth missing (living people)
Living people
BBC people
Alumni of the University of London
Place of birth missing (living people)